The swimming events of the 2008 Summer Paralympics were held in the Beijing National Aquatics Center between September 7 and September 15, 2008. A total of 140 gold medals were expected to be distributed. Paralympic records were broken in 122 events, of which the records in 108 events were also world records.

Classifications
Athletes are allocated a classification for each event based upon their disability to allow fairer competition between athletes of similar ability. The classifications for swimming are:
Visual impairment
S11-S13
Other disability
S1-S10 (Freestyle, backstroke and butterfly)
SB1-SB9 (breaststroke)
SM1-SM10 (individual medley)
Classifications run from S1 (severely disabled) to S10 (minimally disabled) for athletes with physical disabilities, and S11 (totally blind) to S13 (legally blind) for visually impaired athletes.  Blind athletes must use blackened goggles.

Events
Due to the classification process, there were more than one set of medals in each of the traditional swimming events. The following events were held in the various classifications.

Men

Women

Qualification
There were 547 athletes (323 male, 224 female) from 62 nations that took part in this sport.

Medal summary

Medal table

This ranking sorts countries by the number of gold medals earned by their swimmers (in this context a country is an entity represented by a National Paralympic Committee). The number of silver medals is taken into consideration next and then the number of bronze medals. If, after the above, countries are still tied, equal ranking is given and they are listed alphabetically.

Men's events

Women's events

See also
Swimming at the 2008 Summer Olympics
List of Paralympic records in swimming
2008 in swimming

References

External links
Official Site of the 2008 Summer Paralympics

 
2008
2008 Summer Paralympics events
Paralympics